The North East railway line is a railway line in Victoria, Australia. The line runs from Albury railway station in the border settlement of Albury–Wodonga to Southern Cross railway station on the western edge of the Melbourne central business district, serving the cities of Wangaratta and Seymour, and smaller towns in northeastern Victoria. The line is owned by VicTrack, but leased to, and maintained by, the Australian Rail Track Corporation, and forms part of the Sydney–Melbourne rail corridor.

Unlike most other heavy rail lines in Victoria, the line is completely standard gauge, after works were carried out between 2008 and 2010. However, the broad gauge Tocumwal line runs parallel to the line between Seymour and Broadmeadows.

History

The Melbourne and Essendon Railway Company opened the first section of the Albury line, from North Melbourne to Essendon, in 1860. Following its takeover by the Victorian Government in 1867, the line was extended by 1872 to School House Lane on the south side of the Goulburn River near Seymour, and later that year to Seymour and then to Longwood. Violet Town, Benalla, Wangaratta, Springhurst and Wodonga were reached in 1873, connecting with the New South Wales Government Railways at Albury at a break of gauge in 1883. The design engineer was Robert Watson.

Construction of a standard gauge track parallel with the broad gauge from Albury to Melbourne commenced in 1957, completing the Sydney-Melbourne standard gauge railway. The first freight train operated on 3 January 1962, the first passenger train on 16 April.

The line was used by prestige passenger services between the state capitals of Melbourne and Sydney, including the Sydney Limited, Spirit of Progress, Southern Aurora, and Intercapital Daylight. Due to high costs and declining patronage, they were replaced by the XPT in the 1990s.

Maintaining two parallel railways drew criticism, noting inefficiencies in maintaining track, operating trains, and duplicated train control centres. By 2001, the State Government announced the conversion of the broad gauge line to standard, but action was stifled, due largely to complex leasing arrangements. Speed restrictions were eventually applied to the broad gauge line due to track deterioration.

Passenger platforms were to be built on the standard-gauge line, and V/Line locomotives and carriages converted to operate on the line. Costing A$501.3 million, the Victorian Government was to contribute A$171.3 million, the Australian Government A$45 million for the Wodonga Rail Bypass, and the Australian Rail Track Corporation A$285 million and take responsibility for the standard-gauge line under a 45-year lease from Victoria. The project was due for completion by 2010, with passenger services to be disrupted for up to 12 months.

On 8 November 2008, broad gauge passenger trains ceased after the evening V/Line service from Melbourne to Albury and a special train operated by the Seymour Railway Heritage Centre, the final broad-gauge passenger train from Albury to Melbourne. In December 2008, standardisation works commenced, contracted by ARTC to the Southern Improvement Alliance. The first train on the Wodonga Rail Bypass was in March 2010.

In early August 2010, CountryLink decided to terminate all Sydney-Melbourne XPTs at Albury for an indefinite length of time, due to defects in the newly re-sleepered track. "Mud holes" resulted in speed restrictions on more than 200 kilometres (about 66 per cent) of the line, adding an extra 1.5 hours to the travelling time. Train drivers have blamed the ARTC's $285 million concrete sleeper project for the track issues, stating that the incorrect insertion of 300,000 new concrete sleepers is to blame. They have repeatedly reported freight trains breaking couplings due to the rough track. CountryLink trains resumed in mid September 2010, V/Line trains the following year.

Wallan train derailment

On 20 February 2020, a NSW TrainLink XPT passenger train towards Sydney derailed at Wallan, resulting in suspension of freight, V/Line and NSW TrainLink services on the North East Line and the adjacent broad gauge Tocumwal railway line. V/Line services resumed on 1 and 2 March 2020.

Branch Lines

Branch lines south of Seymour
A branch line opened from Heathcote Junction (near Kilmore) to Kilmore in 1888 and to Tooborac in 1890, connecting with a line from Bendigo and Heathcote opened a little earlier. The Heathcote Junction – Heathcote line closed in 1968. A branch line from Kilmore to Lancefield opened in 1892, closed in 1904.

The Mansfield line opened from Tallarook to Yea in 1883, Molesworth in 1889, Cathkin and Merton in 1890 and Mansfield in 1891. It is now closed.  A branch line was built from Cathkin to Koriella in 1890 and Alexandra in 1909. This line closed in 1978.

Branch lines north of Seymour
The Shepparton line opened from Mangalore to Toolamba and Shepparton in 1880.

A branch line opened from Benalla to St James in 1883, Yarrawonga in 1886 and Oaklands in 1938, with a break of gauge there until the State Rail Authority line closed south of Boree Creek. An  branch line from Benalla to Tatong was opened in 1914 and closed in 1947.

The narrow-gauge Whitfield branch line opened from Wangaratta to Whitfield in 1899, closing in 1953.

A branch line opened from Bowser (north of Wangaratta) to Everton in 1875, which was extended to Beechworth in 1876 and Yackandandah in 1891.  The line closed in 1954.  The Bowser – Everton line was extended to Myrtleford in 1883 and Bright in 1890, now closed.  A short line to Peechelba East, which opened in 1928 and closed in 1986, also branched from Bowser.

A short branch line opened from Springhurst via Rutherglen to Wahgunyah in 1879. Services were suspended in 1995.

A branch line opened from Wodonga to Tallangatta between 1889 and 1891, Shelley in 1916, Beetoomba in 1919 and Cudgewa in 1921. A connection from Albury was added near Wodonga, creating a turning triangle to enable the Sydney Limited and its successor Spirit of Progress with their observation cars to be turned as complete trains. The line closed beyond Bandiana in 1981, and the connection to Wodonga later removed, with only standard gauge traffic continuing to use the line via Albury.

Passenger services
The entire line is utilised by V/Line Albury trains, which stops at every station between Albury and Seymour, and NSW TrainLink Southern services to, and from, Sydney (Central), which makes limited stops on this section. Outside this section, all passenger trains heading to, and from, Melbourne only make scheduled stops at Seymour, Broadmeadows and Southern Cross, and no other station.

Seymour and Shepparton V/Line services continue to use the adjacent broad gauge tracks on the Tocumwal line.

References

Further reading

External links
Statistics and detailed schematic map at the vicsig enthusiast website
History Victoria: The North East Railway Story

Railway lines in Victoria (Australia)
Railway lines opened in 1860
Standard gauge railways in Australia
5 ft 3 in gauge railways in Australia
1883 establishments in Australia
Transport in the City of Whittlesea
Transport in the City of Hume
Transport in the City of Brimbank
Transport in the City of Maribyrnong
Public transport routes in the City of Melbourne (LGA)